Fred Alan Wolf (born December 3, 1934) is an American theoretical physicist specializing in quantum physics and the relationship between physics and consciousness. He is a former physics professor at San Diego State University, and has helped to popularize science on the Discovery Channel. He is the author of a number of physics-themed books including Taking the Quantum Leap (1981), The Dreaming Universe (1994), Mind into Matter (2000), and Time Loops and Space Twists (2011).

Wolf was a member in the 1970s, with Jack Sarfatti and others, of the Lawrence Berkeley Laboratory's Fundamental Fysiks Group founded in May 1975 by Elizabeth Rauscher and George Weissmann. His theories about the interrelation of consciousness and quantum physics were described by Newsweek in 2007 as "on the fringes of mainstream science."

Biography
Born into a Jewish family, Wolf's interest in physics began as a child when he viewed a newsreel depicting the world's first atomic explosion. Wolf received his Ph.D. in theoretical physics from UCLA in 1963 and began researching the field of high atmospheric particle behavior following a nuclear explosion.
He has appeared as the resident physicist on the Discovery Channel's The Know Zone, was a participant in the PBS series Closer to Truth, and has appeared on radio talk shows and television shows across the United States and abroad. He also appeared in the films What the Bleep Do We Know!? (2004), The Secret (2006) and Spirit Space (2008). He has lectured on subjects related to quantum physics and consciousness since the 1960s, often under the name Dr. Quantum or Captain Quantum.  He is also featured in the documentary about the Dalai Lama, titled Dalai Lama Renaissance.

His book Taking the Quantum Leap: The New Physics for Nonscientists won a 1982 U.S. National Book Award in Science.

He has taught at San Diego State University, the University of Paris, the Hebrew University of Jerusalem, the University of London, University of Paris at Orsay and Birkbeck College, London.

Works
Books
 Taking the Quantum Leap: The New Physics for Nonscientists (September 1981) Harper Perennial (Revised edition January 25, 1989) , 
 Space-Time and Beyond (1982, with Bob Toben and Jack Sarfatti) Paperback by Bantam; (July 1, 1983) , 
 Star Wave: Mind, Consciousness and Quantum Physics (1984) Macmillan Publishing co. .
 Mind and the New Physics (1985) Heinemann , 
 The Body Quantum: The New Physics of Body, Mind and Health (1986) Macmillan Pub Co , 
 Parallel Universes: The Search for Other Worlds (1988) Simon & Schuster (Reprint edition February 15, 1990) , 
 The Eagle's Quest: A Physicist's Search for Truth in the Heart of the Shamanic World (1991) Touchstone (Reprint edition November 1, 1992) , 
 The Dreaming Universe : A Mind-Expanding Journey Into the Realm Where Psyche and Physics Meet (1994) Simon & Schuster , 
 The Spiritual Universe: One Physicists Vision of Spirit, Soul, Matter, and Self (1996) Published by Simon & Schuster. (Moment Point Press; 2Rev Ed edition October 1, 1998) , 
 Mind into Matter: A New Alchemy of Science and Spirit (2000) Moment Point Press , 
 Matter Into Feeling: A New Alchemy of Science and Spirit (2002) Moment Point Press , 9781930491007
 The Yoga of Time Travel: How the Mind Can Defeat Time (2004) Quest Books , 
 The Little Book of BLEEPS by William Arntz and Betsy Chasse (November 2004) (Wolf contributor/interviewed) Captured Light Distribution , 
 Dr. Quantum's Little Book of Big Ideas: Where Science Meets Spirit (2005) Moment Point Press , 
 What the BLEEP Do We Know!? - Discovering the Endless Possibilities For Altering Your Everyday Reality by William Arntz, Betsy Chasse & Mark Vincente (November 1, 2005) (Wolf contributor/interviewed) HCI , 
 Dr. Quantum in the Grandfather Paradox (with Etan Boritzer) (2007) Elora Media , 
 Time Loops and Space Twists (2010) Hierophant Publishing 

Films
 What the Bleep Do We Know!? (2004) Lord of the Wind Films, LLC
 What the BLEEP – Down the Rabbit Hole - Quantum Edition Multi-Disc DVD Set (2006) Lord of the Wind Films, LLC
 The Secret (2006) Prime Time Productions
 Dalai Lama Renaissance (2007) Wakan Films
 Spirit Space (2008) WireWerks Digital Media Productions
 Rabbit Hole (film) (2010). Wolf's name is visible on a book on parallel universes, an important concept in the film.

Audio
 Dr. Quantum Presents: A User's Guide To Your Universe (2005) Sounds True Audio CD
 Dr. Quantum Presents: Meet the Real Creator—You! (2005) Sounds True Audio CD
 Dr. Quantum Presents: Do-It-Yourself Time Travel'' (2008) Sounds True Audio CD

See also
Quantum mysticism

Notes

References

External links
 www.fredalanwolf.com — Wolf's Web site
 Wolf's weblog
 Video of Fred Alan Wolf with the Dalai Lama during filming of the documentary "Dalai Lama Renaissance"
 Biography of Wolf
 
 

Living people
1934 births
21st-century American physicists
American science writers
Jewish American scientists
Jewish physicists
National Book Award winners
Quantum mysticism advocates
Quantum physicists
Theoretical physicists
21st-century American Jews